The Justice Center is a 1,100-seat multi-purpose arena in Asheville, North Carolina. It is home to the University of North Carolina at Asheville Bulldogs volleyball team and hosted the 2006 Big South Conference women's basketball tournament and 2008 men's tourney.

The Justice Center was replaced by the larger Kimmel Arena for use by UNC Asheville men's and women's basketball teams.  The Kimmel Arena was completed in 2011.

Men's Basketball Highlights
-1969-1971 played to capacity crowds in advancing to NAIA National Playoffs.
-1999-2000 completed the 6th largest comeback in NCAA Division I history by overcoming a 26-point deficit and beating Coastal Carolina

References 

College basketball venues in the United States
Basketball venues in North Carolina
Sports venues in North Carolina
Indoor arenas in North Carolina
UNC Asheville Bulldogs basketball
Buildings and structures in Asheville, North Carolina
College volleyball venues in the United States
1963 establishments in North Carolina
Sports venues completed in 1963